Green Garden is a historic home and farm located near Upperville, Loudoun County, Virginia.  The house was built in four phases.  The original section of the house was built about 1833, and is a portion of the rear ell. The main block was built about 1846, and is a two-story, five bay, single pile brick structure in the Greek Revival style. A two-story rear ell was added about 1856, and it was connected to original 1833 section with an extension in 1921.  The front facade features a three-bay porch with full Doric order entablature. Also on the property are the contributing root cellar (c. 1833), a smokehouse (c. 1847), a barn (c. 1870), a garage/office building (c. 1950), and ice house.

It was listed on the National Register of Historic Places in 2007.

References

Houses on the National Register of Historic Places in Virginia
Farms on the National Register of Historic Places in Virginia
Greek Revival houses in Virginia
Houses completed in 1833
Houses in Loudoun County, Virginia
National Register of Historic Places in Loudoun County, Virginia